Local Route 15 Oenaro-do–Yeonggwang Line is a local route of South Korea that connects Bongnae-myeon, Goheung County, South Jeolla Province to Hongnong-eup in Yeonggwang County, South Jeolla Province.

History
This route was established on 19 July 1996.

Stopovers
 South Jeolla Province
 Goheung County - Boseong County - Suncheon - Boseong County - Hwasun County - Gokseong County - Damyang County - Jangseong County
 North Jeolla Province
 Gochang County
 South Jeolla Province
 Yeonggwang County

Major intersections 

 (■): Motorway
IS: Intersection, IC: Interchange

South Jeolla Province (Goheung -> Jangseong)

North Jeolla Province

South Jeolla Province (Yeonggwang County section)

See also
 South Jeolla Province
 North Jeolla Province
 National Route 15

References

15
Roads in South Jeolla
Roads in North Jeolla